The 2021 Sheffield City Council election took place on 6 May 2021 to elect members of Sheffield City Council in England, as part of the nationwide local elections. The election was originally due to take place on 7 May 2020, but was postponed due to the COVID-19 pandemic. One seat from each ward was up for election.

A delayed local governance referendum (held under the provisions of the Localism Act 2011) also took place at the same time as the local elections.

Overall election result 

Three Labour seats had become vacant, and left unfilled since 2019. Michelle Cook (Broomhill & Sharrow Vale) resigned in February 2020, Olivia Blake (Walkley) resigned in March 2020 and Peter Rippon (Richmond) died in December 2020.

The result had the following consequences for the total number of seats on the Council after the elections:

Local governance referendum results 
The local government reform passed, changing the Council model from a cabinet system to a committee system.

Ward results
* = defending councillor

Beauchief & Greenhill

 

Incumbent Liberal Democrat councillor Bob Pullin did not defend his seat.

Beighton

 

Incumbent Labour councillor Sophie Wilson chose to contest Park & Arbourthorne ward.

Birley

Broomhill & Sharrow Vale

Burngreave

 

Incumbent Labour councillor Jackie Drayton did not defend her seat.

City

Crookes & Crosspool

 

Incumbent Labour councillor Anne Murphy chose to contest Manor Castle ward.

Darnall

Dore & Totley

East Ecclesfield

Ecclesall

Firth Park

Fulwood

Gleadless Valley

 

Incumbent Labour councillor Lewis Dagnall did not defend his seat.

Graves Park

Hillsborough

Manor Castle

 
Anne Murphy was a sitting councillor in Crookes & Crosspool.

Mosborough

Nether Edge & Sharrow

 

Incumbent Labour councillor James Steinke did not defend his seat.

Park & Arbourthorne

 
Sophie Wilson was a sitting councillor in Beighton.

Richmond

 

There were two seats elected due to a vacancy resulting from the death of Labour councillor Peter Rippon a year earlier. Polling the highest number of votes, David Barker won the three-year term (reduced from four years due to the delayed elections), and Mike Drabble won the two-year term (reduced from three years).

Shiregreen & Brightside

Southey

Stannington

 

Incumbent Liberal Democrat councillor David Baker did not defend his seat.

Stocksbridge & Upper Don

 

Jack Clarkson was originally elected for UKIP.

Walkley

 

The Walkley seat was vacant since the Labour councillor Olivia Blake stood down after being elected to Parliament in 2019.

West Ecclesfield

Woodhouse

By-elections

Firth Park

Notes

References

Sheffield
2020s in Sheffield
Sheffield City Council elections